HMS Tyne was a store-ship of the Royal Navy. The ship was launched on 19 January 1878 at Armstrong Mitchell's Low Walker, Newcastle upon Tyne shipyard as the mercantile Mariotis. She was purchased for the Royal Navy on 8 March 1878.
Commanded by Commander John Edward Stokes on 12 March 1879.

On 31 August 1880 the Tyne is shown delivering personnel to HMS London in Zanzibar.. In October 1886, she ran agroud at Sheerness, Kent. She was refloated and found to be undamaged. In May 1902 she was at Malta, on her way to the China station with a new crew for HMS Hermione.

In February 1913, Tyne was serving as one of two depot ships for the 8th Patrol Flotilla, based on the Nore, which was equipped with 23 torpedo boats, and remained as depot ship to the 8th Flotilla in July 1914.

On 16 November 1920 Tyne sprang a leak and sank in the River Medway at Chatham, Kent, while awaiting sale.

References

1878 ships
Ships of the line of the Royal Navy
Ships built on the River Tyne
Maritime incidents in October 1886
Maritime incidents in 1920